Jagose is a surname. Notable people with the surname include:

Annamarie Jagose (born 1965), New Zealand LGBT academic and writer
Una Jagose, New Zealand lawyer